Sinezona insignis is a species of minute sea snail, a marine gastropod mollusk or micromollusk in the family Scissurellidae, the little slit snails.

Description
The shell grows to a height of 1 mm.

Distribution
This marine species occurs off KwaZuluNatal, Port Alfred, South Africa; in the Indian Ocean off Réunion.

References

External links
 To Encyclopedia of Life
 To USNM Invertebrate Zoology Mollusca Collection
 To World Register of Marine Species
 

Scissurellidae
Gastropods described in 1910